Absolutely Fabulous is a British sitcom, created and written by, and starring Jennifer Saunders, with Joanna Lumley, Julia Sawalha, Jane Horrocks, and June Whitfield. It was produced by Saunders & French Productions and BBC Productions, and initially broadcast a successful first run on BBC Two, before moving to BBC One. The series originated from a sketch featured on French and Saunders, which led to a four-year run from 1992 to 1996, followed by a revival from 2001 to 2004, and then a brief return from 2011 to 2012.

Series overview

Episode list

Series 1 (1992)

Series 2 (1994)

Series 3 (1995)

Series 4 (2001)

Series 5 (2003)

20th Anniversary specials (2011–12)

Other media
Prior to the third series, a dramatized behind-the-scenes special was broadcast on 6 January 1995. The special was titled 'How to Be Absolutely Fabulous' and featured Jennifer Saunders as she enters the BBC studio in which the woman at reception is unaware of who Saunders is. Unable to convince the receptionist that she is in fact Edina for the series, Saunders, along with the camera crew runs up to the Absolutely Fabulous office, despite being refused access from the receptionist. Once in the office, Saunders talks about the origins of the series. The special features clips from the series.

A second special, released in 1998 and titled 'Absolutely Fabulous: A Life' features Edina and her mother as she and a camera crew are filming the story of Edina's life in a documentary. The setting for the documentary is in the charity shop in which her mother works. Edina talks about her surroundings in the charity shop, a setting that she is unaccustomed to and certainly is not to her taste. She also reminisces about her life. The special features clips from the series.

A behind-the-scenes special documentary, "The Story of Absolutely Fabulous", was broadcast on 2 January 2004. The special gives a definitive account of the history of the series.

Charity specials
 
A Comic Relief sketch was broadcast on 11 March 2005 which sees Edina and Patsy reluctantly accompany Emma Bunton to the taping of Comic Relief at the BBC Television Centre. Inside, a member of the production staff can't find Emma's name on the list of presenters, prompting Edina to suggest they check again under Queen Noor or Lulu. Emma and Edina bicker in a dressing room when Edina insists that the point of Emma's participation should be to gain greater exposure for herself. Edina urges Emma to lobby director and Comic Relief founder Richard Curtis for a role in one of his films. When Richard visits the dressing room to apologise for Emma having been left off the list, Edina and Patsy fail to recognise him and ask him to fetch Richard straightaway. Emma angrily writes a cheque to the charity and storms off. When the production staffer returns to collect Emma (now scheduled to appear after Graham Norton), Edina and Patsy first conceal (in the dressing room) and then loudly acknowledge (on-stage, live, during the Comic Relief special) Emma's departure. Patsy is struck by stage fright while Edina attempts a song. Once Patsy wets herself, both are quickly shooed from the stage by a horrified Graham. Guest stars include Emma Bunton, Richard Curtis, Graham Norton and Miranda Hart.

A Sport Relief special was broadcast on 23 March 2012 and follows Edina as she is busy training for a Sport Relief charity function with Emma Bunton with disastrous results while Patsy fills in for her downstairs in a meeting with Stella McCartney. Patsy ends up taking the credit for Edina's idea to feature Kate Moss and David Gandy in the magazine, but the only condition is that Patsy must not let Edina anywhere near the shoot. In the gym upstairs, Edina boxes with David Haye and she and Emma end up fighting. Emma punches Edina who ends up getting wheeled through the hotel bar on a stretcher. Guest stars include Llewella Gideon, Kate Moss, Stella McCartney, Emma Bunton, David Gandy, Colin Jackson, Linford Christie and David Haye.

Notes

References

External links
 
 

Absolutely Fabulous
BBC-related lists
Lists of British sitcom episodes